Sławomir Kuczko (born 25 June 1985 in Koszalin) is a Polish swimmer, whose specialty is the breaststroke. He is a European champion, having won the men's 200 m breaststroke at the 2006 European Championships.

In 2006, he also set the Polish Record in the short-course 200 breaststroke at 2:06.61 at the 2006 Short Course European Championships.

In 2012, Kuczko represented Poland at the Olympic Games, swimming the 200 m breaststroke. He placed second in heat no. 2, not qualifying to advance to the semi-finals.

European Championships medal history

European Short Course Championships medal history

References

1985 births
Polish male breaststroke swimmers
Living people
People from Koszalin
Swimmers at the 2012 Summer Olympics
Olympic swimmers of Poland
European Aquatics Championships medalists in swimming
Sportspeople from West Pomeranian Voivodeship
Universiade medalists in swimming
Universiade gold medalists for Poland
Medalists at the 2005 Summer Universiade